Supervivientes 2014: Perdidos en Honduras, is the ninth season of the show Supervivientes and the thirteenth season of Survivor to air in Spain and it will be broadcast on Telecinco from March 17, 2014 to May 27, 2014 approximately. For this year the show returned to Honduras for the fifth time. For this season, Jorge Javier Vázquez acted as the main host at the central studio in Madrid, with Raquel Sánchez Silva co-hosting from the island, and Álvaro de la Lama hosting a side debate of the program.
With this season the tribes were initially divided into two tribes, Cayo Paloma and Isla Bonita. Contestants from Isla Bonita were exempt from main nominations which happened in Cayo Paloma. This season has the record of the Spanish franchise of most evacuations and exits due to medical reasons or family issues, (4 forced ejections and 2 voluntary exits). There was an important twist this season which consists eliminated contestants from Cayo Paloma were not real eliminated and moved to Isla Bonita. Every week each moved Cayo Paloma contestant had to face elimination with the weekly recent eliminated and the one who survives would still remain at Isla Bonita. Following the fifth elimination, the tribes merged into only one tribe and at this point the new eliminated would move to El Palafito, a 12-square metre platform where they would live alone every week. Rafa was the first one to go to El Palafito and he lived there for 5 weeks. When this twist was over, Rafa who win the last vote of El Palafito against Carolina joined the last 3 contestants. Ultimately, it was Abraham García, who won this season over Rafa Lomana and won the €200,000 grand prize and a car.

Finishing order

Nominations

External links
http://www.telecinco.es/supervivientes/

Survivor Spain seasons